Fascination is a 1979 French horror film directed by Jean Rollin, and starring Franca Maï and Brigitte Lahaie. It focuses on a thief who seeks refuge in a remote château where two mysterious women with potentially sinister intentions are residing.

Plot
In April 1905, a group of fashionable Parisian women arrive at an abattoir to drink the blood of an ox as a way to cure anemia, and find the result successful.

Nearby a man named Marc, a thief, escapes from four other thieves. He is planning on heading to London with a bag of gold coins, but must take refuge from his pursuers. He discovers a château isolated in the mountains looked after by two chambermaids, Elizabeth and Eva, who are awaiting the arrival of the Marchioness and her servants. The women, who appear to be bisexual and in a romantic relationship, are not scared, believing Marc is taking them hostage; rather, they find him attractive.

Eva sleeps with Marc, spurring jealousy from Elizabeth. The group of thieves discover where Marc is hiding, and begin shooting at the château. Eva goes outside to hand over the gold, but while two of them count it, the wife of one of the thieves takes Eva's dress. Eva seeks revenge by seducing her husband inside the stables before stabbing him to death; she also kills the woman and the two other men with a scythe.

The Marchioness later arrives with her servants, and they hold a party in which Marc is the only male, so he gets all the attention. When midnight comes, it is revealed that the women habitually lure people into the castle and drink their blood. Elizabeth helps Marc escape, so they hide out in the stables. Eva discovers them and Elizabeth shoots her out of jealousy. Elizabeth and Marc flee and Eva stumbles back to the château where the servants drain her blood. Marc confesses that he loves Elizabeth, whereas she admits that she never loved him and kills him. Elizabeth and the Marchioness go into the sunrise together.

Cast
 Franca Maï as Elizabeth (credited as Franka Mai) 
 Brigitte Lahaie as Eva
 Jean-Pierre Lemaire as Marc
 Fanny Magier as Hélène
 Muriel Montosse as Anita
 Sophie Noël as Sylvie (credited as Sophie Noel)
 Evelyne Thomas as Dominique
 Agnès Bert as herself (credited as Agnes Bert) 
 Cyril Val as Un Apache (credited as Alain Plumey)
 Myriam Watteau as La Femme Apache
 Joe De Palmer as Un Apache (credited as Joe De Lara)
 Jacquel Sansoul

Home media
Image Entertainment released Fascination on DVD in the US in 1999.

Redemption Films released it on DVD in the UK on 28 October 2008 in its original aspect ratio, with special features including a trailer and stills gallery, and again in 2012.

Kino Lorber released it on Blu-ray in 2012 as part of a five-disc Blu-ray collection, along with La Rose de Fer, La Vampire Nue, Le Frisson des Vampires and Lèvres de Sang.

Reception

Reviewing the film on Blu-ray, Charlie Hobbs of Twitch Film wrote, "Upon my first viewing of this film, I found myself struggling a little bit to remain engaged at first, however, around the halfway point, the film picks up significantly and the third act is a thing of beauty".  Budd Wilkins of Slant Magazine, who reviewed the film as part of the five-disc set, wrote, "In Fascination, more than any other film in the set, the sexuality is staged in a manner befitting French erotica".

References

External links
 
 

1979 films
1979 horror films
Erotic horror films
French vampire films
1970s French-language films
Films directed by Jean Rollin
Films set in castles
LGBT-related horror films
1979 LGBT-related films
1970s French films